Roland Koudelka (15 April 1938 - 16 December 2016) was an Austrian male curler and curling coach.

At the national level, he was a four-time Austrian men's champion curler, two-time silver medallist of Austrian mixed championship.

He was married to fellow Austrian champion curler and coach Edeltraud "Traudi" Koudelka.

Teams

Men's

Mixed

Record as a coach of national teams

References

External links

 

1938 births
2016 deaths
Austrian male curlers
Austrian curling champions
Austrian curling coaches